The White Horse, now known as The Cask and Stillage, is a public house in High Street, Potters Bar, England, and a grade II listed building with Historic England.

References

External links

Grade II listed pubs in Hertfordshire
Potters Bar